The 2016 FC Kairat season is the 6th successive season that the club playing in the Kazakhstan Premier League, the highest tier of association football in Kazakhstan, since their promotion back to the top flight in 2009. As reigning Kazakhstan Cup champions, Kairat will participate in the Kazakhstan Super Cup and the Europa League.

Aleksandr Borodyuk replaced Vladimír Weiss as the club's manager at the start of the season, but resigned as manager on 5 April following a poor start to the season. On 7 April, Kakhaber Tskhadadze was announced as the club's new manager.

Squad

Transfers

Winter

In:

Out:

Trialists:

Summer

In:

Out:

Released

Friendlies

Competitions

Kazakhstan Super Cup

Kazakhstan Premier League

Regular season

Results summary

Results by round

Results

League table

Championship round

Results summary

Results by round

Results

League table

Kazakhstan Cup

Final

UEFA Europa League

Qualifying rounds

Squad statistics

Appearances and goals

|-
|colspan="14"|Players away from Kairat on loan:

|-
|colspan="14"|Players who left Kairat during the season:

|}

Goal scorers

Disciplinary record

Notes

References

External links
Official Website
Official VK

FC Kairat seasons
Kairat